The 1934–35 FAW Welsh Cup is the 54th season of the annual knockout tournament for competitive football teams in Wales.

Key
League name pointed after clubs name.
B&DL - Birmingham & District League
FL D2 - Football League Second Division
FL D3N - Football League Third Division North
FL D3S - Football League Third Division South
MWL - Mid-Wales Football League
SFL - Southern Football League
WLN - Welsh League North
WLS D1 - Welsh League South Division One
WLS D2 - Welsh League South Division Two
W&DL - Wrexham & District Amateur League

First round

Second round
15 winners form the First round plus three new clubs. Mold Alexandra and Milford Haven get a bye to the Third round.

Third round
Nine winners from the Third round plus Mold Alexandra. Milford Haven get one more bye.

Fourth round
Five winners from the Third round, Milford Haven plus 14 new clubs.

Fifth round
Seven winners from the Fourth round plus Porth United. Barry, Lovell's Athletic and Llanerch Celts get a bye to the Sixth round.

Sixth round
Four winners from the Fifth round, Barry, Llanerch Celts, Lovell's Athletic and nine new clubs.

Seventh round

Semifinal
Swansea Town and Chester played at Wrexham.

Final
Final were held in Wrexham.

External links
The FAW Welsh Cup

1934-35
Wales
Cup